The Confederation of North, Central American and the Caribbean Futsal (CONCACFUTSAL)0 is the governing body of futsal for countries and regions under the Asociación Mundial de Futsal (AMF).

History 
CONCACFUTSAL was founded on October 13, 2000 with professor Lorenzo Garcia of Mexico named its first president. Garcia served until 2006 when his vice president Wildrido Coffi was elected as leader. Coffi was re-elected at the III. Congress of CONCACFUTSAL in October 2011.

Suriname was named host of the 2015 AMF Futsal Men's World Cup qualifying played from October 11–19, 2014. Competing teams included Canada, Costa Rica, Curaçao, Mexico, Saint Martin and the United States. Curaçao won the right to represent the federation in Belarus.

Members

CONCACFUTSAL at AMF World Cup 
CONCACFUTSAL nations have won the AMF Men's World Cup on four occasions. Before the CONCACFUTSAL formation, Venezuela captured the world title in 1997. Colombia (2000, 2011, 2015) is the current cup holder. Colombia hosted the second edition of the AMF Women's World Cup in 2013, defeating Venezuela in the Final by 3–2.

References

External links 
 CONCACFUTSAL archive
 Asociación Mundial de Fútsal

Futsal organizations